Hofstra University is a private university in Long Island, New York, United States.

It is Long Island's largest private university. Hofstra originated in 1935 as an extension of New York University under the name Nassau College – Hofstra Memorial of New York University.  It became an independent Hofstra College in 1939 and gained university status in 1963. Comprising ten schools, including the Zucker School of Medicine at Hofstra/Northwell and Deane School of Law, Hofstra has hosted a series of prominent presidential conferences and several United States presidential debates.

History

The college was founded in 1935 on the estate of namesake William S. Hofstra (1861–1932), a lumber entrepreneur of Dutch ancestry, and his second wife Kate Mason (1854–1933). It began as an extension of New York University (NYU) under the name Nassau College – Hofstra Memorial of New York University. It became the fourth and most recent American college or university named after a Dutch American, and the only one that occurred in the 20th century.

The extension had been proposed by a Hempstead resident, Truesdel Peck Calkins, who had been superintendent of schools for Hempstead. In her will, Kate Mason provided the bulk of their property and estate to be used for a charitable, scientific or humanitarian purpose, to be named in honor of her husband. In the spring of 1934, the estate was offered to be converted into a sanitarium for those suffering with polio by the Georgia Warm Springs Foundation, specifically offering to President Franklin Roosevelt, but nothing had materialized from it. Two friends, Howard Brower and James Barnard, were asked to decide what to do with the estate. Calkins remarked to Brower that he had been looking for a site to start an institution of higher education, and the three men agreed it would be an appropriate use of the estate. Calkins approached the administration at New York University, and they expressed interest.

The college was founded as a coeducational, commuter institution with day and evening classes. The first day of classes at Nassau-Hofstra Memorial College was September 23, 1935, with 150 students enrolled and an equal divide between men and women. The first class of students was made up of 159 day and 621 evening students. The tuition fee for the year was $375. The college obtained provisional charter status, and its official name was changed to Hofstra College on January 16, 1937.

Hofstra College separated from New York University on July 1, 1939, and was granted an absolute charter on February 16, 1940.

In 1939, Hofstra celebrated its first four-year commencement, graduating a class of 83 students. The first graduates had strong feelings for the new institution. When they were allowed to choose whether they would receive degrees from New York University or Hofstra, they overwhelmingly chose Hofstra degrees. Academic recognition of Hofstra was affirmed when the Middle States Association of Colleges and Schools accepted Hofstra for membership on November 22, 1940. Early in 1941 the college was elected to membership in the American Association of Colleges.

In 1950, Calkins Gymnasium was the site of the first Shakespeare Festival. It was performed on a five-sixths-sized replica of the Globe Theatre. The festival is now performed on the Globe Stage, the most accurate Globe Theatre replica in the United States.

With the approval of the New York State Board of Regents, Hofstra became Long Island's first private university on March 1, 1963, thus becoming Hofstra University. Also in that year, the Board of Trustees resolved to make Hofstra architecturally barrier-free for individuals with physical disabilities, stating that all students should have access to higher education. This later became federal law, and Hofstra was subsequently recognized as a pioneer. Other forward-thinking programs and events followed, including the New Opportunities at Hofstra (NOAH) program, which was established the following year. NOAH is Hofstra's Arthur O. Eve Higher Education Opportunity Program.

In 1963, Mitchel Air Force Base was closed by the military and declared surplus property. The university asked for part of the area to be used for educational purposes, and was subsequently granted . Remnants of the concrete runways from the Air Force base are now parking lots for Hofstra's North Campus. The Hofstra University Museum was also established that year.

In 1968, a three-bank Aeolian pipe organ was donated to Hofstra by John T. Ricks and Jane Ricks King, in the name of their late parents, Mr. and Mrs. Jesse Ricks. The organ was originally located in the former Ricks estate, Chanticlare, in Flower Hill, New York. Jesse Ricks was the former president and chairman of Union Carbide, and Mrs. Ricks was a volunteer church organist who often held organ performances at the estate for friends on Sundays. The organ was scheduled to be installed in the Hofstra Playhouse the following fall, and enabled organ music majors at Hofstra to practice on-campus - as opposed to at the nearby Episcopal Cathedral of the Incarnation.

Hofstra Stadium served as the site of the first-ever NCAA Division I Men's Lacrosse Championship game in 1971.

The university reorganized its divisions into “schools” in the 1960s. Hofstra was authorized by the Board of Regents to offer its first doctoral degrees in 1966. In 1968, the Hofstra Stadium became the first to install Astroturf outdoors in the East, and the New York Jets began holding their summer training camp to the North Campus, until 2008, when the Jets moved to Florham Park, New Jersey.

Dutch heritage 
The university's founder, William S. Hofstra, was proud of his Dutch roots and that is reflected throughout Hofstra University's campus.

It is one of three major American universities named after Dutch Americans, after Rutgers University for Henry Rutgers and Vanderbilt University for Cornelius Vanderbilt.

Hofstra's original logo was a seal created by Professor of Art Constant van de Wall in 1937. The insignia was derived from the official seal of the reigning house of the Netherlands, the House of Orange-Nassau. Used with the permission of the monarch of the Netherlands, the seal also included the Dutch national motto Je Maintiendrai, meaning “I stand steadfast” (literally “I shall maintain”) in French.Hofstra's flag is modeled after the Netherlands' Prince's Flag, and its orange, white and blue pattern was altered to feature the school's colors of gold and navy blue. In 1939, the Dutch ambassador to the United States left behind a flag of the Netherlands before he returned to his country for World War II, which influenced Hofstra's school colors, university seal and coat of arms.

Hofstra also pays homage to its Dutch heritage with a miniature windmill structure near the admissions building and the planting of thousands of tulips in the springtime. In 1985, the commissioner to the Queen of the Netherlands presented the university with the Hofstra University Tulip, a flower hybrid named after the school. It is a focal point of Hofstra's annual springtime Dutch Festival.

An on-campus housing complex is known as "the Netherlands" and features residence halls named after Dutch cities, including Delft, Groningen, Hague, Leiden, Rotterdam, Tilburg, Utrecht, Breukelen and Amsterdam.

Hofstra's athletic teams were known as the Flying Dutchmen until 2001.

Campus 

The Arboretum and Bird Sanctuary at Hofstra University has a collection of diverse trees and reflecting its Dutch origin, and displays an array of rare and colorful tulips in the Spring.

The part of the campus located south of Hempstead Turnpike (NY Route 24) and west of California Avenue is located in the Village of Hempstead. The part of the campus north of Hempstead Turnpike and east of California Avenue is located in Uniondale and East Garden City. Hofstra also offers an MBA program as well as other classes in New York City from a center in Manhattan.

The campus is located across the street from the "Nassau Hub" and Nassau Veterans Memorial Coliseum, former home of the New York Islanders, Long Island Nets, New York Riptide, and New York Open.

Academics

Rankings and reputation

Hofstra University is accredited in 28 academic areas and 32 total areas. Hofstra University offers 160 undergraduate and 170 graduate program options.

Hofstra was ranked tied for 160th among national universities and named the 92nd 'best value school' by U.S. News & World Report for 2020, with its undergraduate engineering program ranked tied for 33rd among schools where doctorates are not offered. U.S. News also rated the part-time MBA program tied for 154th and the graduate programs in education as 133rd, among others.

The Hofstra University Honors College, whose admissions policy is more selective than that of the university as a whole, offers rigorous educational opportunities for high-achieving students. The School for University Studies provides a program for students whose abilities are not reflected in standardized test scores; while New Opportunities at Hofstra (NOAH) is designed for students whose educational progress to date has been restricted by limited educational opportunities or economic status.

In the fall of 2011, the university welcomed the first class of students in its new Hofstra Northwell School of Medicine. In 2012, it established its School of Engineering and Applied Science, featuring programs that partner with regional industry leaders, and its School of Health Sciences and Human Services, housing a new master of public health program. In August 2017, after a $61 million donation to the school, it was renamed the Donald and Barbara Zucker School of Medicine at Hofstra/Northwell.

The Zucker School of Medicine at Hofstra/Northwell was ranked No. 55 in primary care and No. 71 in research, according to U.S. News & World Report, despite only being 2 years since its first class graduated.

Hofstra University hosted the third and final 2008 presidential debate (between Barack Obama and John McCain) on October 15, 2008. The debate, the first presidential debate in New York since the 1960 debate between John F. Kennedy and then Vice-president Richard M. Nixon, focused on economic policy and domestic issues. It is remembered for McCain's introduction and frequent references to "Joe the Plumber".

Hofstra's successful bid to host this presidential debate in 2008 provided the springboard for a broad, campus-wide program called "Educate '08," featuring a year of free lectures, conferences and other events about politics and public policy. The program featured national media and political figures as guest speakers, including George Stephanopoulos, Maureen Dowd, Ari Fleischer, James Carville and Mary Matalin. "Educate '08" gave way to "Define '09", a program which brought to campus various speakers to examine the impact of the historic election of the nation's first African-American president and the policy challenges facing the Obama Administration.

In September 2009, Hofstra University President Stuart Rabinowitz announced the appointment of two senior presidential fellows at the university's Peter S. Kalikow Center for the Study of the American Presidency: Republican strategist and former presidential advisor Edward J. Rollins and former Vermont governor, presidential candidate and Democratic National Committee Chairman Howard Dean. In October 2011, the Commission on Presidential Debates announced it had chosen Hofstra for its second 2012 presidential debate on October 16, 2012, the "town hall" debate (between Barack Obama and Mitt Romney). Hofstra University hosted the first 2016 presidential debate between Donald Trump and Hillary Clinton on September 26, 2016.

Schools and colleges
 Hofstra College of Liberal Arts & Sciences, also known as Hofstra College, or Hofstra College of Arts & Sciences
 Peter S. Kalikow School of Government, Public Policy, and International Affairs
 School of Education
 School of Humanities, Fine and Performing Arts
 School of Natural Sciences and Mathematics
 Frank G. Zarb School of Business
 Honors College
 The Lawrence Herbert School of Communication
 School of Health Professions and Human Services
 Fred DeMatteis School of Engineering and Applied Science
 Maurice A. Deane School of Law
 Donald and Barbara Zucker School of Medicine at Hofstra/Northwell
 Hofstra Northwell School of Graduate Nursing and Physician Assistant Studies

Centers and institutes
 Center for Children, Families and the Law
 Center for Civic Engagement
 Center for Educational Access and Success (CEAS)
 Center for Entrepreneurship
 Center for Legal Advocacy
 National Center for Suburban Studies
 Center for Technological Literacy
 Center for the Study of Higher Education
 Center for the Study of Labor and Democracy (CSLD)
 Hofstra University Cultural Center (HUCC)
 Institute for Health Law and Policy
 Institute for Real Estate
 Institute for the Study of Conflict Transformation
 Institute for the Study of Gender, Law and Policy
 Institute for the Study of Legal Ethics
 Long Island Studies Institute (LISI)
 Center for the Study of International Financial Service and Markets
 Peter S. Kalikow Center for the Study of the American Presidency
 The Joan and Arnold Saltzman Community Services Center
 Scott Skodnek Business Development Center (BDC)
 Wilber F. Breslin Center for Real Estate Studies
 Hofstra University Museum
 Asia Center
 Center for Climate Study
 Center for Innovation
 The Digital Research Center at Hofstra University
 Hofstra University Bioethics Center
 Institute for Forensic Linguistics, Threat Assessment, and Strategic Analysis at Hofstra University

Athletics

Hofstra University teams were nicknamed the Flying Dutchmen from 1935 until 2001. The school's official team name became "The Pride" in 2001, referring to a pair of lions which became the school's athletic mascots in the late 1980s. The Pride nickname evolved from the Hofstra Pride on- and off-campus image campaign that began in 1987, during the university's dramatic recovery and growth. This followed a financial crisis in the 1970s that forced the layoff of more than 100 employees. In 1977 Hofstra wrestler Nick Gallo won the 126 lb weight class at the NCAA National Championship and was a member of the 1976 and 1980 U.S. Olympic Freestyle Wrestling teams, he was also given the title "Most Outstanding Wrestler" in the 1977 NCAA Division I Wrestling Championships. The school's revival was credited in large part to the man who led the university from 1976 to 2001—educator, government official and former Hofstra football star Dr. James M. Shuart. Hofstra Stadium, the school's main outdoor athletic facility, has been named James M. Shuart Stadium since 2002.

Prior to 2008, the New York Jets held summer training camp at their on-campus headquarters before moving to their new headquarters in Florham Park, New Jersey. The area has since been used for the construction of the medical school building, which was completed in 2015.

On December 3, 2009, the university announced it was terminating the football program. Under NCAA rules, any football players who chose to transfer to other schools were eligible to play immediately, and not subjected to normal residency waiting periods. Scholarship-holders who wished to stay at Hofstra were permitted to keep their scholarships. Funds previously used for the football program went into the creation of the medical school, and enhancing a variety of programs, including hard sciences and engineering.

Hofstra Stadium was home to the New York Lizards, a professional lacrosse team in the Major League Lacrosse (MLL) that played prior to the merger with Premier Lacrosse League in 2020.

On February 26, 2011, Hofstra Senior Day, the university retired the basketball jersey number 22 to honor senior Charles Jenkins before the end of the season. Jenkins, the school's all-time leading scorer, ranked fifth in the nation at 23.3 points per game last season and was the front-runner to win Colonial Athletic Association Player of the Year honors. "I think it's very rare," head coach Mo Cassara said by phone to reporter Jeff Eisenberg. "We have 25 other athletes that have had their numbers retired here at Hofstra, but none of them have ever been retired while they were still here at their last games. He's been such an integral part of this university on so many levels that we thought that was the highest honor we could give him." No other Hofstra athlete in any sport has received the same honor.

The Hofstra University Pride Wrestling team competes in the Eastern Intercollegiate Wrestling Association, as wrestling is not supported by the Colonial Athletic Association.

Media

Student newspaper
The Hofstra Chronicle is the only student newspaper at Hofstra University. Established in 1935 and supported by the student activity fee and advertising, it is published in tabloid format every Tuesday evening each semester, with additional content available online.

Student radio station
The university operates Long Island's oldest public radio station, WRHU-FM (88.7). The non-commercial station was founded in 1950 as WHCH, a campus-limited station, and received its broadcast license on June 9, 1959, using the call letters WVHC. The station became WRHU (for Radio Hofstra University) in 1983. WRHU currently serves as the radio home of the Long Island Nets and New York Islanders, producing over 675 NHL broadcasts since 2010. It is the only student-run radio station to receive four Marconi Awards from the National Association of Broadcasters.

Notable alumni and faculty

Honorary degree recipients

See also

Hofstra (surname), notable people with this surname.

References

External links

 
 Hofstra Athletics website

 
Educational institutions established in 1935
Private universities and colleges in New York (state)
Hempstead (village), New York
Universities and colleges on Long Island
Universities and colleges in Nassau County, New York
Universities and colleges in New York City
1935 establishments in New York (state)